The Geelvink pygmy tree frog (Litoria pygmaea) is a species of frog in the subfamily Pelodryadinae. It is found in New Guinea. Its common name refers to Geelvink Bay (presently Cenderawasih Bay) where its type locality, the Yapen island lies.
Its natural habitats are subtropical or tropical moist lowland forests, freshwater marshes, intermittent freshwater marshes, rural gardens, urban areas, and canals and ditches.

References

Litoria
Amphibians of New Guinea
Amphibians of Indonesia
Amphibians of Papua New Guinea
Amphibians described in 1875
Taxonomy articles created by Polbot